Dragutin Ciotti (19 October 1905 – 17 March 1974) was a Croatian gymnast. He competed in the men's team and won the bronze medal at the 1928 Summer Olympics.

The son of a teacher Giuseppe Ciotti, Italian by nationality and Albina Ciotti, née Blečić. After the turbulent years spent in Rijeka, after the First World War, the family moved to the State of Slovenes.

He was a big fan of the gym and trained in the Croatian "Sokol" sports society. He was the seventh of ten children.

He managed to get into the national team, then one of the three strongest win the world. He was one of the few of the Croats at the time. There he represented the Kingdom of Yugoslavia. He was a member of society "Sokol Sušak Rijeka".

After his sports career, he worked for the forest-wood industry: «Jugodrvo», «Transjug», «Exportdrvo». Until the end of life kept in touch with acquaintances athletes.

References

1905 births
1974 deaths
Yugoslav male artistic gymnasts
Croatian male artistic gymnasts
Croatian people of Italian descent
Olympic gymnasts of Yugoslavia
Gymnasts at the 1928 Summer Olympics
Olympic bronze medalists for Yugoslavia
Olympic medalists in gymnastics
Medalists at the 1928 Summer Olympics
Sportspeople from Rijeka